"Wrecked" is a song by American band Imagine Dragons. It was released through Interscope and Kidinakorner on July 2, 2021, as the second single from their fifth studio album, Mercury – Act 1. It was written by band members Dan Reynolds, Wayne Sermon, Ben McKee, and Daniel Platzman, who also produced it.

Background
The song was inspired by lead singer Dan Reynolds’ sister-in-law (his brother's wife), Alisha Durtschi Reynolds, who died from cancer, Reynolds said in a press: "She was the brightest light. A beacon of joy and strength for everyone she met. Her sudden passing has shaken me in ways that I still am unable to express. I was with her and my brother when she passed, and it was the first time in my life that I had witnessed death in this way. It sealed into my mind the fragility of life and finality of this all. I’ve watched my brother face something that no one should have to. But I’ve also seen his faith bring him hope in a future with her. I can only hope for the same."

He described the song was his "way of dealing with it all, as music has always been my refuge. No longer being a man of fervent faith, I can only hope that she hears it somewhere in a place where she is healed and no longer in pain. This song is my wish for an eternity with those that I love."

Credits and personnel
Credits adapted from AllMusic.

 Serban Ghenea – engineer, mixing
 John Hanes – mixing engineer
 Imagine Dragons – primary artist, producer, recording
 Jason Lader – engineer
 Ben McKee – bass, composer
 Randy Merrill – mastering engineer
 Dylan Neustadter – engineer
 Jonathan Pfarr – engineer
 Daniel Platzman – composer, drums
 Dan Reynolds – composer, programming, vocals
 Wayne Sermon – composer, programming, guitar

Charts

Weekly charts

Year-end charts

Certifications

Release history

References

2021 singles
2021 songs
Imagine Dragons songs
Interscope Records singles
Kidinakorner singles
Songs written by Ben McKee
Songs written by Daniel Platzman
Songs written by Dan Reynolds (musician)
Songs written by Wayne Sermon